Supersonic Festival is a yearly music festival in Birmingham featuring a combination of music, art, film and other crafts.

See also
 List of music festivals in the United Kingdom

External links
 Official Supersonic Website
 Official Supersonic Wikifestivals Profile

Music festivals in the West Midlands (county)
Festivals in Birmingham, West Midlands
2003 establishments in England
Music festivals established in 2003